Alfonso García Robles (20 March 1911 – 2 September 1991) was a Mexican diplomat and politician who, in conjunction with Sweden's Alva Myrdal, received the Nobel Peace Prize in 1982.

García Robles was born in Zamora, Michoacán, and trained in law at the National Autonomous University of Mexico (UNAM), the Institute of Higher International Studies in Paris, France (1936) and The Hague Academy of International Law in the Netherlands (1938) before joining his country's foreign service in 1939.
  
He served as a delegate to the 1945 San Francisco Conference that established the United Nations. 
He was ambassador to Brazil from 1962 to 1964, and was state secretary to the ministry of foreign affairs from 1964 to 1970.  In 1971–1975 he served as his country's representative to the United Nations before an appointment as foreign minister in 1975–76.  He was then appointed as Mexico's permanent representative to the Committee on Disarmament of the UN.

García Robles received the peace prize as the driving force behind the Treaty of Tlatelolco, setting up a nuclear-free zone in Latin America and the Caribbean.  The agreement was signed in 1967 by most states in the region, though some states took some time to ratify the agreement.

He was admitted to the Colegio Nacional of Mexico in 1972. His name was inscribed at the Wall of Honor of the Palacio Legislativo de San Lázaro, Mexico's House of Representatives' building, in 2003. His widow died in 2005 aged 83.

See also
 List of peace activists

References

Further reading 

 

1911 births
1991 deaths
Nobel Peace Prize laureates
Members of El Colegio Nacional (Mexico)
People from Zamora, Michoacán
Politicians from Michoacán
National Autonomous University of Mexico alumni
Mexican Nobel laureates
Ambassadors of Mexico to Brazil
Government ministers of Mexico